The men's 1500 metres race of the 2015–16 ISU Speed Skating World Cup 3, arranged in Eisstadion Inzell, in Inzell, Germany, was held on 6 December 2015.

Denis Yuskov of Russia won the race, while Kjeld Nuis of the Netherlands came second, and Joey Mantia of the United States came third. Peter Michael of New Zealand won the Division B race.

Results
The race took place on Sunday, 6 December, with Division B scheduled in the morning session, at 11:41, and Division A scheduled in the afternoon session, at 14:53.

Division A

Division B

References

Men 1500
3